The London Lightning is a Canadian professional basketball team based in London, Ontario, Canada, with home games at the Budweiser Gardens. The team is a charter member of the National Basketball League of Canada (NBLC) that began play for the 2011–12 season and won the league's first championship. The Lightning have won the most NBLC championships with five.

History
The Lightning name was announced on August 12, 2011.  On August 17, former Albany Patroons and Lawton-Fort Sill Cavalry head coach Micheal Ray Richardson was announced as the Lightning's first head coach. The Lightning would go on to win the 2012 NBL championship, defeating the Halifax Rainmen 116-92 on March 25, 2012 at the John Labatt Centre to take the best-of-five championship series three games to two.

Carlos Knox was unveiled as the new Lightning head coach on July 17, 2014. He led the team to an 18–14 record. Knox was dismissed in August 2015 after hiding player Jonathan Mills' positive drug test results from Vito Frijia and the league. He was replaced by former Mississauga Power head coach Kyle Julius later in the month.

Julius would lead the Lightning to back-to-back championship appearances in 2016 and 2017, winning the championship in the latter. He would be replaced by former Niagara College and interim Niagara River Lions head coach, Keith Vassell. Vassell led the Lightning to another championship in 2017–18, but was fired after a 4–4 record in the 2018–19 season.

Home arenas
Originally opened in 2002, the Budweiser Gardens is a sports-entertainment centre, in London, Ontario, Canada. The arena has a capacity of 9,000. The Lightning shares the arena with London Knights of the Ontario Hockey League.

Current roster

Season-by-season record

References

External links
 

 
National Basketball League of Canada teams
Sports teams in London, Ontario
Basketball teams in Ontario
Basketball teams established in 2011
2011 establishments in Ontario